The Goldsboro Metropolitan Statistical Area, as defined by the United States Census Bureau, is an area consisting of one county – Wayne – in North Carolina, anchored by the city of Goldsboro. As of the 2000 census, the MSA had a population of 113,329 (though a July 1, 2009 estimate placed the population at 113,811).

Counties
Wayne

Communities
Brogden (unincorporated; census-designated place)
Dudley (unincorporated)
Elroy (unincorporated; census-designated place)
Town of Eureka
Town of Fremont
City of Goldsboro (Principal city)
Mar-Mac (unincorporated; census-designated place)
Town of Mount Olive
Town of Pikeville
Town of Seven Springs
Village of Walnut Creek

See also
North Carolina census statistical areas

References

Metropolitan areas of North Carolina